PP-151 Lahore-VIII is a Constituency of Provincial Assembly of Punjab.

General elections 2018

See also
 PP-150 Lahore-VII
 PP-152 Lahore-IX

References

External links
 Election commission Pakistan's official website
 Awazoday.com check result
 Official Website of Government of Punjab

Provincial constituencies of Punjab, Pakistan